The Mexican Olympic Committee (COM) is the organization that represents Mexican athletes in the International Olympic Committee (IOC), the Pan American Games and the Central American and Caribbean Games. It was created and formally recognized by the IOC in 1923. The organization is currently directed by María José Alcalá.

The Mexican Olympic Committee is headquartered in Mexico City, Mexico.

History
As early as the 1900 Universal Exposition of Paris, Baron Pierre de Coubertin thought that Mexico should enter the next Olympic Games In 1901, he met with the Mexican ambassador Miguel de Beistegui in Belgium, where they decided to form the National Olympic Committee of Mexico. After this meeting, they sent a letter on May 25, 1901 to General Porfirio Diaz (the president of Mexico at the time) to inform him that Beistegui would be the representative of Mexico before the International Olympic Committee. However, Mexico (after participating in the 1900 games) did not participate in the Olympics again until 1924.

In 1923, Baillet Latour, then vice-president of the International Olympic Committee, visited Latin America to invite countries to go to the Paris 1924 Summer Olympics. He arrived in Mexico after visiting the countries of Argentina, Brazil, Chile, Paraguay and Uruguay on February 16, 1923.

See also

 Mexico at the Olympics

References

External links
Official website 

National Olympic Committees
Sports governing bodies in Mexico
Mexico at the Olympics
1923 establishments in Mexico
Sports organizations established in 1923